The following is a list of notable deaths in July 1997.

Entries for each day are listed alphabetically by surname. A typical entry lists information in the following sequence:
 Name, age, country of citizenship at birth, subsequent country of citizenship (if applicable), reason for notability, cause of death (if known), and reference.

July 1997

1
Lester Asheim, 83, American librarian and scholar of library science.
Annie Fratellini, 64, French circus artist, film actress and clown, cancer.
Joshua Hassan, 81, Gibraltarian politician and Chief Minister of Gibraltar.
David Martin, 81, Australian novelist, poet, playwright, journalist, and reviewer and lecturer.
Harold McQueen, Jr., 44, American convicted murderer, execution by electric chair.
Robert Mitchum, 79, American actor (The Story of G.I. Joe, Cape Fear, The Night of the Hunter), complications from lung cancer and emphysema.
Mohammad Ali Mojtahedi, 88, Iranian University professor.
Gerhard Wiltfang, 51, German equestrian and Olympic champion.

2
George Antonio, 82, English footballer.
Chiquito, 65, Filipino actor and comedian, liver cancer.
Flint Gregory Hunt, 38, American convicted murderer, execution by lethal injection.
Dee Moore, 83, American Major League Baseball player.
James Stewart, 89, American actor (It's a Wonderful Life, Rear Window, Vertigo), Oscar winner (1941), heart attack as a result of pulmonary embolism.

3
Johnny Copeland, 60, American blues guitarist and singer, complications during heart surgery.
Gloster B. Current, 84, American NAACP activist, leukemia and pneumonia.
Natalia Dumitresco, 81, French-Romanian abstract painter.
Rufe Gentry, 79, American baseball player.
Michael James MacDonald, 87, Canadian politician and union leader.
Thomas Sgovio, 80, American artist and Soviet Union Gulag inmate.
Stanley Stanczyk, 72, American weightlifter and Olympian.

4
William Cadogan, 7th Earl Cadogan, British peer and military officer.
Bengt Danielsson, 75, Swedish anthropologist, writer, and a crew member on the Kon-Tiki raft expedition.
Charles Kuralt, 62, American journalist, complications from lupus.
Slobodan Mišković, 52, Serbian handball coach and player.
Miguel Najdorf, 87, Polish-Argentinian chess grandmaster.
Amado Carrillo Palomino, 40, Mexican drug lord, complications during cosmetic surgery.
Bevis Reid, 78, British track and field athlete and Olympian.
Eddie Smith, 70, Australian racing cyclist.
John Zachary Young, 90, English zoologist and neurophysiologist.

5
Bob Dees, 67, American gridiron football player.
Jean-Marie Domenach, 75, French writer and intellectual.
Mrs. Miller, 89, American singer.
Les Norman, 83, Australian politician.
Arunasalam Thangathurai, 61, Sri Lankan Tamil politician.

6
Chetan Anand, 76, Indian Hindi film producer, screenwriter and director.
Gabriel Asaad, 90, Turkish-Swedish Assyrian composer and musician.
Dorothy Buffum Chandler, 96, American cultural leader.
Stanisław Horno-Popławski, 94, Russian-Polish painter, sculptor and pedagogue.
Gene James, 72, American basketball player.
Brun Smith, 75, New Zealand cricket player.

7
Mate Boban, 57, Bosnian Croat politician and the only president of the Croatian Republic of Herzeg-Bosnia, stroke.
Alfons De Winter, 88, Belgian football player.
Jerry Doggett, 80, American sportscaster.
Raffaele Dolfato, 34, Italian rugby player and entrepreneur, traffic collision.
Henry Howell, 76, American politician, cancer.
Sven Håkansson, 87, Swedish long-distance runner and Olympian.
Jean Luciano, 76, French football player and manager.
Oku Mumeo, 101, Japanese politician and feminist.
Luis Aguirre Pinto, 89, Chilean composer, folk musician and folklorist.
Royston Tickner, 74, British actor.
Rolando Tinio, 60, Filipino poet, dramatist, actor, and essayist.
Erik Zetterström, 92, Swedish writer and playwright.

8
Charles L. Drake, 73, American geologist, heart failure.
Dick van Dijk, 51, Dutch football player (FC Twente, Ajax Amsterdam), acute endocarditis.
Georges Gay, 71, French racing cyclist.
Guy Murchie, 90, American author and aviator.
Abu Sadat Mohammad Sayem, 81, Bangladeshi jurist and statesman.
Charles P. B. Taylor, 65,Canadian journalist, author, and thoroughbred racehorse owner and breeder, cancer.
Tony Thomas, 69, British-American film historian, author, and producer, pneumonia.
Max E. Youngstein, 84, American film producer.

9
Alexander Cordell, 82, Welsh novelist and author, (body found on this date).
Carol Forman, 79, American actress.
Aurelio González, 91, Paraguayan football player.
Walter Korn, 89, Czech-American writer of books and magazine articles about chess.
Georgeta Năpăruș, 66, Romanian modernist painter.
David Pitblado, British principal private secretary to successive Prime Ministers.
Stan Rojek, 78, American baseball player.
Marianne Schönauer, 77, Austrian actress.

10
Ivor Allchurch, 67, Welsh football player.
Dwight Lowry, 39, American baseball player, heart attack.
Abe Okpik, 69, Canadian Inuit community leader.
Frank R. Parker, 57, American civil rights lawyer and activist, complications from an aortic aneurysm.

11
Felix Barker, 80, British drama critic and historian.
Fred Beavis, 82, Canadian politician, pneumonia.
Joe Hauser, 98, American baseball player.
Edward Lasker, 85, American businessman and thoroughbred racehorse owner.
Alfred Mellows, 75, English rower and Olympic medalist.
Jock Sturrock, 82, Australian yachtsman and Olympian.
Robert V. Whitlow, 78, American military officer, football coach, and sports club executive.

12
Pietro Buscaglia, 86, Italian football player.
Meribeth E. Cameron, 92, American historian of China and academic.
Blas Chumacero, 92, Mexican trade union leader.
François Furet, 70, French historian, head injury while playing tennis, heart failure.
Douglas Huebler, 72, American conceptual artist.
Steve Karrys, 73, Canadian football player.
Vinko Nikolić, 85, Croatian writer, poet and journalist.
Frank Shuter, 54, New Zealand speedway rider, traffic accident.
Jean Varenne, 71, French indologist.
Miroslav Wiecek, 65, Czech football player.

13
Garfield Barwick, 94, Australian politician, lawyer, and Chief Justice of Australia.
Miguel Ángel Blanco, 29, Spanish politician and ETA victim, executed.
Alexandra Danilova, 93, Russian-American prima ballerina.
Rosy Gibb, 54, Irish social worker, clown, and magician, cancer.
Ekaterina Kalinchuk, 74, Soviet gymnast and Olympic champion.
Kurt Land, 84,  Austrian-Argentine film director.
Edi Rada, 74, Austrian figure skater and Olympic medalist.
Alf Tveten, 84, Norwegian sailor and Olympian.

14
Eddie Finnigan, 84, Canadian ice hockey player.
Eugene Goossen, 76, American art critic and art historian, pneumonia.
Joseph F. Holt, 73, American politician.
Isaac Nicola, Cuban guitarist.
Polly Shackleton, 87, American politician.
Hilda Watson, 75, Canadian politician.

15
Alan J. Charig, 70, English palaeontologist, stroke.
Dick Chorovich, 64, American gridiron football player.
Cheryl Linn Glass, 35, American racing driver, suicide.
Eve Greene, 91, American screenwriter.
Rosamund Greenwood, 90, British actress.
Justinas Lagunavičius, 72, Lithuanian basketball player.
Stefan Marinov, 66, Bulgarian physicist, suicide.
Gianni Versace, 50, Italian fashion designer and founder of the Versace fashion house, shot.

16
Ron Berry, 77, Welsh author and novelist.
Dora Maar, 89, French photographer, painter, and poet.
William H. Reynolds, 87, American film editor (The Godfather, The Sound of Music, The Sting), Oscar winner (1966, 1974), cancer.
Franciszek Sulik, 88-89, Polish-Australian chess master.

17
Bianco Bianchi, 80, Italian cyclist.
Don Bingham, 67, American gridiron football player.
R. Krishnan, 87, Indian film director.
Thomas Mellon Evans, 86, American financier, complications following a fall.
Arthur Jepson, 82, English cricket player.
Hugo Gunckel Lüer, 95, Chilean pharmacist and botanist.
Dave Peterson, 66, American ice hockey coach
Birgitte Price, 63, Danish actress.
Gene Warren, 80, American visual effects artist (The Time Machine) and television producer (Land of the Lost), Oscar winner (1961), cancer.
Robert C. Weaver, 89, American economist and academic.

18
André Drobecq, 96, French racing cyclist.
Léon Gaultier, 82, French nazi collaborator during World War II and founding member of Front National.
James Goldsmith, 64, Anglo-French financier, tycoon, and politician, pancreatic cancer.
Igor Linchevski, Russian botanist.
Oddvar Richardsen, 60, Norwegian football player and manager.
Eugene Merle Shoemaker, 69, American geologist and planetary science pioneer, car accident.
Harold Spina, 91, American composer of popular songs.
Gregorio Weber, 81, Argentinian biochemist.

19
Frank Farrell, 50, British rock musician (Supertramp).
Hec Gervais, 63, Canadian curler.
John E. Hines, 86, American Episcopal Church bishop.
Jim Peebles, 76, American football player (Washington Redskins).
Tugelbay Sydykbekov, 85, Kyrgyzstani writer.

20
Puneet Nath Datt, 24, Indian Army officer, killed in action.
Alf Engen, 88, Norwegian-American skier.
Ed Klewicki, 85, American football player.
M. E. H. Maharoof, 58, Sri Lankan politician, gunshot wounds.
Drummond Matthews, 66, British marine geologist and geophysicist.
Eric Charles Milner, 69, Canadian mathematician.
Arshi Pipa, 76, Albanian-American philosopher, writer and poet.
Linda Stirling, 75, American showgirl, model, and actress, cancer.

21
Tony Alvarez, 40, Spanish Australian actor and singer, AIDS-related cancer.
Sjaak Alberts, 71, Dutch football player.
Paul K. Benedict, 85, American anthropologist and linguist, traffic accident.
Roger Bowman, 69, American baseball player.
Růžena Grebeníčková, 71, Czech literary historian and theorist.
Ernst Majonica, 76, German politician (CDU).

22
Khalil Ahmed, 61, Pakistani composer.
Irving Geis, 88, American artist.
Vincent Hanna, 57, Northern Irish television journalist, heart attack.
Jean-Jacques Herbulot, 88, French sailor and Olympiian.
Kevin Howley, 73, English football referee.
János Mogyorósi-Klencs, 75, Hungarian gymnast and Olympian.
Sondra Rodgers, 94, American actress.
Fritz Scheller, 82, German cyclist.

23
Walter Behrendt, 82, German politician.
Jeff Cross, 78, American baseball player.
Andrew Cunanan, 27, American spree killer and murderer of Gianni Versace, suicide by gunshot.
Dequinha, 69, Brazilian football player.
Andrea Domburg, 74, Dutch actress.
Chūhei Nambu, 93, Japanese track and field athlete, pneumonia.
Simon Pierre Tchoungui, 80, First Prime Minister of Cameroon.
David Warbeck, 55, New Zealand actor and model, cancer.

24
William J. Brennan, 91, Associate Justice of the Supreme Court of the United States (1956–1990).
Bob Gaddy, 73, American East Coast blues and R&B pianist, singer and songwriter, lung cancer.
Edward Gardère, 88, French fencer and Olympian.
Brian Glover, 63, English actor (Alien 3, Kes, An American Werewolf in London) and writer, brain tumor, brain cancer.
László Görög, 93, Hungarian-American screenwriter.
Saw Maung, 69, Burmese army general and statesman, heart attack.
Frank Parker, 81, American tennis player.
Bill Shine, 85, British actor.

25
Natallia Arsiennieva, 93, Belarusian playwright, poet and translator.
Jack Bickham, 66, American novelist, lymphoma.
Peter Carmichael, 73, British fighter pilot during World War II and the Korean War.
Jack Davies, 80, New Zealand swimmer.
Ralph Goldstein, 83, American épée fencer and Olympian, car accident.
Ben Hogan, 84, American golf champion.
David McFaull, 48, American sailor and Olympian.
Boris Novikov, 72, Soviet actor, complications from diabetes.
Matiu Rata, 63, New Zealand Māori politician, traffic accident.

26
Jaime Milans del Bosch, 82, Spanish lieutenant general and co-leader of 1981 coup d'état, brain tumor.
Kunihiko Kodaira, 82, Japanese mathematician.
Bob Nussbaumer, 73, American gridiron football player.
Denis Smallwood, 78, British Royal Air Force senior commander.

27
Muhammad Mahdi Al-Jawahiri, 98, Iraqi poet.
Isabel Dean, 79, English actress.
Heinrich Liebe, 89, German naval officer during World War II.
René Persillon, 78, French football player.
K'tut Tantri, 99, Scottish American hotelier and broadcaster known as "Surabaya Sue".

28
Rosalie Crutchley, 77, British actress.
John FitzPatrick, 82, Australian politician.
Bud Hardin, 75, American baseball player.
Leo Loudenslager, 53, American aviator, motorcycle accident.
Gordon McMaster, 37, Scottish politician, suicide.
Seni Pramoj, 92, Thai politician and Prime Minister, heart disease and kidney failure.

29
Jack Archer, 75, English sprinter.
Mykhailo Byelykh, 38, Soviet/Ukrainian  football player and a coach, traffic collision.
Shinsaku Himeda, 80, Japanese cinematographer (Tora! Tora! Tora!).
Edward A. Kawānanakoa, 72, American member of the Hawaiian House of Kawānanakoa.
John H. Ware III, 88, American politician.
Chuck Wayne, 74, American jazz guitarist.

30
Giuseppe Anedda, 85, Italian mandolin player.
Robert Bryce, 87, Canadian civil servant.
Emil J. Husak, 66, American politician.
Charlotte van Pallandt, 98, Dutch painter and sculptor.

31
Bảo Đại, 83, Vietnamese emperor of the Nguyễn dynasty, brain cancer.
Hepi Te Heuheu, 78, New Zealand Māori chief.
Vichit Kounavudhi, 75, Thai film director and screenwriter.
Eddie Miller, 80, American baseball player.
Vern Riffe, 72, American politician and speaker.
Frans Schoubben, 63, Belgian racing cyclist.

References 

1997-07
 07